Nygårds Power Station is a hydroelectric power plant in Storelva in Narvik. It has a power output of 25 MW generated by three vertical Francis turbines. Originally, it was used also for the generation of single phase AC for the railway, but today only three phase AC is produced.

See also

 Nygårdsfjellet Wind Farm
 Rombaksfjorden

References

External links 
 https://web.archive.org/web/20110719062453/http://www.ee.kth.se/php/modules/publications/reports/2010/IR-EE-ES_2010_006.pdf

Buildings and structures in Nordland
Hydroelectric power stations in Norway
Narvik